Dolichognatha cygnea is a species of spider in the family Tetragnathidae, found in Venezuela.

References

Tetragnathidae
Spiders of South America
Spiders described in 1893